The Cloisters Cross (also known as the Bury St Edmunds Cross), is a complex 12th-century ivory Romanesque altar cross or processional cross. It is named after The Cloisters, part of the Metropolitan Museum of Art in New York, which acquired it in 1963.

The cross was probably carved in England between 1150 and 1160. It is made from walrus ivory and measures 22 × 14 in. (57.5 × 36.2 cm). It includes highly detailed carvings on both sides and a number of inscriptions. The imagery features the crucifixion of Jesus and the symbols of the Evangelists. The intent of its iconography is subject to debate.

Description
The carvings which cover both front and back sides include ninety-two intricately carved figures and ninety-eight inscriptions.  The figures are only about one-half inch tall, and illustrate a number of Biblical persons and scenes. Each side consists of a central circular medallion and three square terminals, all of which contain highly detailed carvings. The front has the ascension of Jesus at top, his resurrection on the left, and the crucifixion on the right. The terminals on the reverse show the symbols of three of the Four Evangelists: John (the eagle), Mark (the lion) and Luke (the ox); the reverse contains a number of other depictions of Old Testament prophets. The now lost base presumably had Matthew's winged man on the reverse, while Christ before Caiaphas is assumed to have been at the front.

The Old Testament prophets on the reverse have banderoles containing quotations from their books.

Interpretation
There is debate over whether or not these inscriptions are chosen with an anti-Semitic intent. The Metropolitan Museum of Art's website currently says: "Prominent among the inscriptions are several strong invectives against Jews. Though it is impossible to know precisely who commissioned this piece and with what aims, the cross certainly offers some indication of the anti-Semitism prevalent in England at this time. By the end of the thirteenth century, Jews were expelled from the country". This theme was developed in a book by Thomas Hoving, the curator involved when the Metropolitan acquired the cross, and later Director. This was unkindly described in an academic review of Elizabeth C. Parker and Charles T. Little as "an autobiographical romance...written in Raymond Chandler style"; the review also expressed doubt that the cross, a sophisticated theological object, was specifically designed for the purpose of either castigating or converting any member of the small Jewish population in England in the mid-twelfth century.

Provenance
The name of the sculptor is unknown. Thomas Hoving, who managed its acquisition while associate curator at The Cloisters, concluded that it was carved by Master Hugo at Bury St Edmunds Abbey in Suffolk. However, beyond stylistic affinities there is no certain evidence to suggest that the cross was even made in England; although this is accepted by most scholars, other places of origin such as Germany have been proposed.

Its provenance before it was acquired by the Croatian art collector Ante Topić Mimara (1898–1987) is unknown.  He sold it to the Metropolitan in 1963. The British Museum had wanted to buy the cross but eventually declined because of Topić Mimara's inability to prove that he had full title to sell the cross. Hoving reportedly stayed up drinking coffee with Topić Mimara until the British Museum's option lapsed at midnight, then purchased the cross immediately for £200,000.

Gallery

Front

Rear

See also
 Art theft and looting during World War II
 Quod scripsi, scripsi

References

Sources

 Hoving, Thomas. King of the Confessors. NY: Simon & Schuster, 1981
 Hoving, Thomas. King of the Confessors: A New Appraisal. Christchurch: Cybereditions Corporation, 2001
 Jones, Bernice. "A Reconsideration of the Cloisters Ivory Cross with the Caiaphas Plaque Restored to Its Base". Gesta, University of Chicago Press, volume 30, No. 1, 1991. 
 Parker, Elizabeth. "Editing the 'Cloisters Cross'". Gesta, volume 45, no. 2; 50th Anniversary of the International Center of Medieval Art, 2006. 
 Parker, Elizabeth; Little, Charles. The Cloisters Cross. NY: Metropolitan Museum of Art, 1994 Full online PDF from MMA
 Watson, Peter; Todeschini, Cecilia. The Medici Conspiracy: The Illicit Journey of Looted Antiquities from Italy's Tomb Raiders to the World's Greatest Museums. NY: Public Affairs, 2007

External links
Picture at the Met website
The Cloisters Cross Research Papers : 1960-2000. The Cloisters Library and Archives, Metropolitan Museum of Art, New York

Ivory works of art
Medieval European sculptures
Sculptures of the Metropolitan Museum of Art
Altar crosses
Individual crosses and crucifixes
12th-century sculptures
Romanesque sculptures